Ariel Esteban Páez Bergel (born 20 January 1994) is a Chilean former footballer who played as an attacking midfielder.

References

External links
 Ariel Páez at Football Lineups
 

1994 births
Living people
People from Los Andes Province, Chile
Chilean footballers
Chile youth international footballers
Colo-Colo footballers
Colo-Colo B footballers
Deportes La Serena footballers
Chilean Primera División players
Segunda División Profesional de Chile players
Primera B de Chile players
Association football midfielders